Ageleradix is a genus of East Asian funnel weavers first described by Xu & Li in 2007.

Species
 it contains six species:
Ageleradix cymbiforma (Wang, 1991) — China
Ageleradix otiforma (Wang, 1991) — China
Ageleradix schwendingeri Zhang, Li & Xu, 2008 — China
Ageleradix sichuanensis Xu & Li, 2007 — China
Ageleradix sternseptum Zhang, Li & Xu, 2008 — China
Ageleradix zhishengi Zhang, Li & Xu, 2008 — China

References

Agelenidae
Araneomorphae genera
Spiders of China